Mortimer is an English surname.

Mortimer may also refer to:

People
 Mortimer (given name)

Places

North America
Mortimer, North Carolina, a ghost town
Mortimer, Ohio, an unincorporated community
Mortimer, New Brunswick, Canada, an unincorporated community

United Kingdom
Mortimer Common, Berkshire, England, a village generally referred to as Mortimer
Mortimer Trail, a long-distance footpath and recreational walk in Shropshire and Herefordshire, England

Fictional characters
Mortimer, a name sometimes given to the Grim Reaper (see Death (personification)), with its origin in the Latin word morti (to die)
Mortimer Mouse, a Disney character
Mortimer Snerd, a character developed by Edgar Bergen
Mortimer Brewster, main character in Arsenic and Old Lace
Mortimer, the eponymous protagonist of Terry Pratchett's novel Mort
Mortimer Delvile, one of the protagonists in Cecilia (Burnley novel)
Mortimer Folchart, a character in Cornelia Funke's Inkheart series of fantasy books
Mortimer, a Robert Munsch character and story
Mortimer, a fictional criminal in Italian comic book Zagor
Morty Smith in Rick and Morty
Uncle Mortimer, a theme park mastermind from the video games Thrillville and Thrillville: Off the Rails.
Phillip Mortimer, one of the protagonists from the Blake and Mortimer comic book series

Other uses
Baron Mortimer, a title in the Peerage of England
Baron Mortimer of Wigmore, two titles in the Peerage of England
Mortimer Community College, a coeducational secondary school in South Shields, Tyne and Wear, England

See also
Earl of Oxford and Earl Mortimer, a title in the Peerage of Great Britain
Mortimer West End, Hampshire, England, a village and civil parish 
Cleobury Mortimer, Shropshire, England, a small town and civil parish
Stratfield Mortimer, Berkshire, England, a village
Mortimer's disease, a skin disease
Ruy Lopez, Mortimer Trap, a chess opening trap